Kozelsky (masculine), Kozelskaya (feminine), or Kozelskoye (neuter) is the name of several rural localities in Russia:
Kozelskoye, Kaluga Oblast, a village in Borovsky District of Kaluga Oblast
Kozelskoye, Ryazan Oblast, a village in Aristovsky Rural Okrug of Klepikovsky District of Ryazan Oblast